Shadi Al Hamwi  (born 8 August 1995) is a Syrian footballer who plays for Al-Karamah in the Syrian Premier League and for the Syrian national team.

International career
Al Hamwi made his first senior appearance for Syria on 10 October 2019, in the 2022 FIFA World Cup qualification against Maldives.

Honours

Club

Al-Jazeera
Jordanian Pro League runner-up: 2017–18
Jordan FA Cup: 2017–18

References

External links
 Shadi Al Hamwi at Playmakerstats.com
 Shadi Al Hamwi at Whoscored.com

1995 births
Living people
Association football forwards
Syrian footballers
Syrian expatriate footballers
Syria international footballers
Al-Karamah players
Al-Faisaly SC players
Al-Yarmouk FC (Jordan) players
Shabab Al-Aqaba Club players
Al-Jazeera (Jordan) players
Al-Ramtha SC players
Najran SC players
Manama Club players
Najaf FC players
Iraqi Premier League players
Saudi First Division League players
Bahraini Premier League players
Expatriate footballers in Jordan
Expatriate footballers in Saudi Arabia
Expatriate footballers in Bahrain
Expatriate footballers in Iraq
Syrian expatriate sportspeople in Jordan
Syrian expatriate sportspeople in Saudi Arabia
Syrian expatriate sportspeople in Bahrain
Syrian expatriate sportspeople in Iraq